Augustine University, Ilara also known as AUI is a private Catholic-owned University located in Ilara, a town in Epe local government area of Lagos State Southwestern Nigeria. The University which was approved on 25 February 2015 by the Federal Government of Nigeria through the National Universities Commission offers courses at undergraduate and post graduate levels.

Courses offered in Augustine University Ilara 

 Accounting
 Banking and Finance
 Biochemistry
 Biological Sciences
 Biology
 Biotechnology
 Business Administration
 Chemistry
 Computer Science
 Cyber Security
 Economics
 English Language
 Fisheries and Agriculture
 Information Technology
 Mass Communication
 Mathematics
 Microbiology
 Philosophy
 Physics
 Political Science
 Religious Studies
 Software Engineering

See also
Academic libraries in Nigeria

References

External links 
Augustine University

2008 establishments in Nigeria
Catholic universities and colleges in Nigeria
Educational institutions established in 2008
Universities and colleges in Lagos
Academic libraries in Nigeria